The semiotics of dress is the study of design and customs associated with dress (clothing), as patterned to a kind of symbolism that has rules and norms. It describes how people use clothing and adornments to signify various cultural and societal positions.

"Semiotics" is defined as the philosophical study and interpretation of signs. The semiotic system is not limited to just verbal communication. Therefore, the term "semiotics of dress" can be further referred to as a non-linguistic semiotic resource which interrelates with facial expressions, gestures and body semiotics in an effort to develop and communicate meaning.
People develop meaning of signs and signals based on an individual and personal ideology.

It is important to note that clothing and fashion, by definition, are not the same. While clothing is defined as "any covering of the human body", fashion is defined as the style of dress accepted by members of a society as being appropriate for specific times and occasions.

The human body is the key element of this non-linguistic semiotic resource. The way one dresses is informed by the biological and social needs of the individual. Central to the semiotics of dress is the psychology of self-perception and self-presentation, both as individuals who see themselves, as well as how individuals are seen within a greater group, society, culture or subculture.

Social views
When the term semiotics is applied to dress, it refers to the words and symbols used to describe the images supporting "the structure of social interaction". Examples of these social interactions include: the system of statuses and roles. Therefore, the way one dresses can be analyzed as a symbol mechanism to communicate ideas and values with other members in a society, as sociologists Erving Goffman and Gregory P. Stone have suggested.

Clothing is a visual signifier that can be interpreted differently based especially on context and culture. Fred Davis expressed the difficulty of understanding and interpreting clothing and fashion. Davis explained that the difficulty is increased because similar expressive elements frequently have substantial differences in symbolic influence based on geographic and demographic differences."

Symbolism/ideals/values of dress 
Ruth Rubinstein, a sociologist and author, identified six distinct categories of dress.
"Clothing symbols," have several meanings and involve individual choice and preference. Name brand athletic wear is an example.  
"Clothing tie-signs," are specific types of clothing that indicate membership in a community outside of mainstream culture. Amish and Hutterite attire are examples. 
"Clothing tie-symbols," act as a means of broader social affiliation emanating especially from fears, hopes, and dreams. This can include Save the Earth clothing, Pro-Choice T-shirts, and religious crosses.
"Personal dress," refers to the "I" component we bring in when dressing the public self. This category allows for individuality in the public sphere.
"Contemporary fashion," is the interaction between political and economic events and consumer sentiments, involving public memory.
"Clothing signs," is the sixth category, and is made up of three sub-categories. The first, is task oriented or instrumental in nature; the second, is having one primary meaning; and the third, is being recognized as a sign for those who wear it.

Clothing that shows or portrays some kind of authority in society would fall in the first category. An example would be military uniforms, wigs used in English courts, law enforcement uniforms, clerical collars, or the trademark white labcoat of a medical doctor. People who wear these kinds of clothing are expected by society to behave in certain ways. Not only that, but it is assumed that they possess certain economic, educational and social statuses.

Clothing that separates the sexes, and creates differences between a male and a female, would fall into the second category of clothing signs according to Rubinstin. Sex differences in clothing are due to "Social judgments, personal evaluation and appropriate expectations of dress". Because of these, society has coercive power upon colors, shapes and fabrics in the clothes that men and women should wear. Men would wear pants while women would wear skirts, for example. 

Within the third category one may find "seductive attire" as it was labeled by Flugel. However, wearing sex-specific clothing doesn't necessarily mean one will feel sensual or inclined to have sexual intercourse. Perhaps a better understanding of this could be derived from the church fathers, who said that seductive attire is a mixture of exposure and coverage of the body. A clothing piece one may use for reference is the décolletage, which was "first in use during the end of the Middle Ages".

Symbolism in clothing or dress is very much subjective, unlike clothing signs. Symbols in clothing don't represent one's level in a social institution. Therefore, they are not governed by any kind of rules or regulations. Clothing symbols are a reflection of what a specific society believes is valuable at a given time. Clothing symbols do not offer implications about a person's rights, duties or obligations, and they should not be used to judge or predict one's behavior. Therefore, an intimate comprehension of an individual's history as well as time investment is required to understand and comprehend an individual through clothing symbols.

Cultural values in dress can easily increase an individual's self-significance by portraying those good, desirable values in accordance with one's society. This can be further explained by looking at or taking members of the European aristocracy as an example. They would wear clothes made with expensive fabrics and ornaments, which would differentiate them from the rest. All in efforts to show others that they possess a privileged place in a social class, where they could not be seen working in a field. Therefore, giving the impression of freedom and relaxation from harsh labor, unlike their servants. Cultural dress has the ability to disclose information about intimate aspects of our lives and relationships.It also projects perceptions about class.

Men v. women 
Throughout history there has been a separation between the roles and relationships that men and women play. These socially structured differences between men and women have contradicted each other at times. Fashion has picked up on the tensions left by these contradictions as well. The symbolic separation of men and women is fundamental to the history of dress. As time has gone by, the forms of clothing (colors, fabrics and shapes) have changed, but the idea of gender difference has survived. From an early point in life, children learn to differentiate between a male and a female based on clothing and hairstyles. An example this may be attributed to is television cartoons where superheroines are pictured with strong and muscular bodies. However; due to their clothing, they portray an image or an idea to the viewer of being sexy or attractive, therefore putting her physical strength as a secondary attribute.

Psychology in dress 
Psychologist J. C. Flugel concluded that styles of dress affect one's appearance, yet triggering feelings that enable role performance. This means that when an individual's body and clothes fuse together to form one, the individual's sense of importance increases. Increments in one's sense of importance yields to feelings and behaviors of being able to control the environment in which one is in. At the same time, this may work backwards. In other words, if one's body and clothes don't come together as a whole, then one may feel embarrassed, and therefore belittle its sense of importance. Flugel called this idea Image Contrast.

Clothing can be perceived as one's medium or channel for self-expression. Every day people communicate ideas and express feelings about them to others through the use of clothing, and vice versa. This way of thinking leads to the idea of the social self, which is that the idea of self-reflection is a social construction.

Self-perception 
The term self-schema could be used to defined thought processes that modify, organize and integrate qualities assigned to the self. This idea may include visual images or verbal descriptions that people may use to describe which "look" suits them best and which "look" doesn't.

Teen boys see themselves as more physically effective than teen girls. While at the same time, teen girls perceive themselves as being more effective by means of attractiveness. Recently these perceptions among men and women have changed. Women are increasingly concerned with their physical effectiveness, while men have become more interested in their physical attractiveness. Today, unlike men, women are more critical when assessing their bodies in terms of physical fitness, appearance, health and sexuality. However, both men and women tend to be equally satisfied when it comes to their bodies and their self-perceptions.

See also

References

Further reading
R. Broby-Johansen, Body and Clothes (1968)
J. C. Flugel, The Psychology of Clothes (1930)
 
 
 

Clothing
Semiotics